Sir Marcus Lawrence Loane  (14 October 191114 April 2009) was an Australian Anglican bishop. He was the Anglican Archbishop of Sydney from 1966 to 1982 and Primate of Australia from 1977 to 1982. He was the first Australian-born Archbishop of Sydney and also the first Australian-born archbishop in the Anglican Church of Australia. He was a prolific author and his works include several biographies.

Early life
Loane was born on 14 October 1911 in Tasmania. His family moved to north Queensland, then to Sydney.  He studied at the University of Sydney. He then entered Moore Theological College, an Anglican conservative evangelical seminary, to train for ordination.

Ordained ministry
In 1935, Loane was ordained in the Church of England in Australia (the church was renamed the Anglican Church of Australia in 1981). He spent nearly all his ministry in the Anglican Diocese of Sydney except for two years during World War II as an army chaplain in New Guinea. After the war he was appointed vice-principal and then principal of Moore Theological College. In 1958, he was appointed a coadjutor (assistant) bishop in the diocese.

Personal life
Loane married Patricia Knox on 31 December 1937.  She was the daughter of the rector of St Paul's, Chatswood. Together, they had four children; Mary, Robert, David and Winsome. They celebrated 71 years of marriage in 2008.

Loane died in Sydney on 14 April 2009 at the age of 97.

Honours
In the 1976 New Year Honours, he was appointed a Knight Commander of the Order of the British Empire (KBE).  He was also appointed Chaplain of the Venerable Order of Saint John on 5 December 1978.

Works 
Biblical and doctrinal:
 Infant baptism and immersion : what the Bible teaches, (1941)
 Vox Crucis, or, Echoes from Calvary, (1944)
  Mary of Bethany, (1949)
 The man of sorrows, (1953)
 The crown of thorns, (1954)
  The Voice of the Cross, (1956)
 The Prince of Life, etc. (Studies dealing ... with the Resurrection and Ascension of our Lord Jesus Christ), (1947)
 Key-texts in the Epistle to the Hebrews, (1961)
 Then came Jesus : Studies in Luke 24 and John 20, (1962)
  It is the Lord. (1965)
 Do you now believe? ... A short introduction to Christian doctrine based on the Apostles' Creed, (1966) 
 The hope of glory: an exposition of the eighth chapter in the 'Epistle to the Romans, (1968) 
 This surpassing excellence. Textual studies in the Epistles to the Churches of Galatia and Philippi, (1969) 
  By Faith We Stand - key texts in 2 Corinthians, (1971) 
 Grace and the Gentiles : expository studies in six Pauline Letters, (1981) 
 Godliness and contentment : studies in the pastoral epistles, (1982) 
 In exile on Patmos : studies in the Gospel, First Epistle and Apocalypse of St John the Divine, (1993) 
  From Bethlehem to Olivet, (1998) 
  His name was Jesus, (1999)
  Genesis and the Patriarchs, (2000)
  This Same Jesus - Studies in the life of JesusBiographical and historical''':
 Handley Carr Glyn Moule 1841-1920, (1947)
 Oxford and the Evangelical Succession, (1951)
 Cambridge and the Evangelical Succession, (1952)
 Masters Of The English Reformation, Church Society (1954) & Banner of Truth Trust (2005), 
 A Centenary History of Moore Theological College, (1955)
 Archbishop Mowll : the biography of Howard West Kilvinton Mowll, Archbishop of Sydney and Primate of Australia, (1960)
 Makers of Religious Freedom in the Seventeenth Century, (1960)
 Sons of the Covenant, (1963)
  The Story of the China Inland Mission, (1965)
 Makers of our heritage. A study of four Evangelical leaders, (1967)
 John the Baptist as witness and martyr, (1968) 
 They were pilgrims, (1970) , & Banner of Truth Trust (2006) 
 Pioneers of the Reformation in England, (1964) 
 Amazing grace: some aspects and insights in the life of the apostle Paul, (1972) 
 John Charles Ryle, 1816-1900, (1983) 
 Three faithful servants, (1991) 
 

 References 

Further reading
 Reid, John R., Marcus L. Loane: a biography'', Melbourne: Acorn Press (2005), 

1912 births
2009 deaths
People from Tasmania
Primates of the Anglican Church of Australia
Evangelical Anglican bishops
Academic staff of Moore Theological College
Anglican archbishops of Sydney
Australian Knights Commander of the Order of the British Empire
Seminary presidents
Australian military chaplains
World War II chaplains
People educated at North Sydney Boys High School
University of Sydney alumni
Moore Theological College alumni